Sir Nigel Hamilton, KCB, DL was Head of the Northern Ireland Civil Service until 2008.

He became a Knight Commander of the Order of the Bath in the 2008 New Year Honours.
Hamilton was made an Honorary Graduate of the University of Ulster and awarded a Doctor of the University (DUniv) on 3 July 2008 in recognition of his contribution to public administration in Northern Ireland especially during the years of the Northern Ireland peace process.

References

Deputy Lieutenants of Belfast
Knights Commander of the Order of the Bath
Living people
Year of birth missing (living people)
Heads of the Northern Ireland Civil Service